Orchids is the debut album of dream pop band Astral.  It contained ten songs and was released in 2003.  The title track, Orchids, is a highly melodic instrumental slightly reminiscent of space rock.  The record was mixed at Stout Recording Studio in Oakland, California and was engineered by Randy Burk, who in the past had worked with Swingin' Utters The album charted #119 on the CMJ 200.  Two songs, Orchids and Raining Down, were preloaded on the Rio Carbon MP3 Players.

Track listing

Barreling (3:09)
Blinder (4:35)
In Heaven (3:22)
Under Lock and Key (3:55)
Turn Me Around (2:41)
Slumber (4:54)
Orchids (3:01)
Last Light (4:05)
Raining Down (3:29)
Forbidden Kiss (5:19)

Notes

2003 debut albums
Astral (band) albums